Fortress Hill (literally Barbette Hill) is a station on the  of the Hong Kong MTR system. The station is located in the Fortress Hill section of Hong Kong on the eponymous island. Like all MTR stations, Fortress Hill has a unique colour scheme; its livery is dark green.

History
On 31 May 1985, Fortress Hill station opened with the first phase of the Island line. Fortress Hill's livery is green.

Station layout
Fortress Hill is laid out in a manner similar to many other MTR stations. Passengers enter on the ground level and take escalators down to the concourse. From the concourse level they take another escalator ride down to the platform.

Platforms 1 and 2 are arranged in an island platform layout. In a similar manner to the deep-level London Underground stations, each track and platform is in a separate tube shaft with a common entrance and exit point between the two tubes. Each platform is equipped with platform screen doors for safety and ventilation reasons. As with most of the Island Line platforms, the platform walls are curved.

There are only four escalators that connect the concourse and the platforms; they are some of the longest in the MTR system.

Entrances and exits
There are two exits at Fortress Hill station. Both are located on the same side of King's Road but on opposite ends of the Fortress Metro Tower, a high-rise residential complex.

A: for the AIA Tower and Citicorp Centre
B: for the Olympia Plaza and Electric Centre

References

MTR stations on Hong Kong Island
Island line (MTR)
Fortress Hill
Railway stations in Hong Kong opened in 1985
1985 establishments in Hong Kong